Warwick Thomas Taylor (born 11 March 1960) is a former New Zealand rugby union player. He won 24 caps for the All Blacks between 1983 and 1988 and played in the victorious New Zealand team at the 1987 Rugby World Cup.

Since retiring from rugby, Taylor has taught physical education at Burnside High School in Christchurch. He was assistant coach of the New Zealand women's national rugby union team from 2007–2009.

References

External links

1960 births
Living people
Rugby union players from Hamilton, New Zealand
People educated at Matamata College
University of Otago alumni
New Zealand international rugby union players
New Zealand rugby union players
Otago rugby union players
Canterbury rugby union players
Rugby union centres